The black-spotted sticky frog (Kalophrynus pleurostigma) is a small frog with a black spot just in front of each of its hind legs.  It releases a sticky substance when threatened, thereby making it an unpleasant meal for predators, allowing it to escape from harm.

This species develops in the pitchers of some carnivorous Nepenthes, a habitat that is fast diminishing locally. On a global scale, it is not yet considered threatened by the IUCN.

References

External links
Amphibian and Reptiles of Peninsular Malaysia - Kalophrynus pleurostigma

Kalophrynus
Amphibians of the Philippines
Nepenthes infauna
Amphibians described in 1838